The men's 100 meter running deer, double shots was a shooting sports event held as part of the shooting at the 1912 Summer Olympics programme. It was the second appearance of the event, which had been introduced in 1908. The competition was held on July 3,1912.

Twenty sport shooters from six nations competed.

Results

References

External links
 
 

Shooting at the 1912 Summer Olympics
100 meter running deer at the Olympics